Viikki Church is an Evangelical Lutheran church in the Viikki district of Helsinki, Finland. Completed in 2005, it is the newest of the city's church buildings. The church was designed by architect Samuli Miettinen of JKMM Architects. The church is part of Malmi parish.

The church is mostly wooden: the floors, ceiling, walls and pillars are made of spruce and the outer cladding and double shingling are aspen. Furnishings are made of oak and aspen.

The church seats 200 people; when combined with the parish meeting hall the capacity is 400.

References

External links
 

Lutheran churches in Helsinki
Wooden churches in Finland
Churches completed in 2005
2005 establishments in Finland